The Village Bottoms is a historic cultural district in the predominantly Black neighborhood of West Oakland, California.  Its current revitalization and cultural arts renaissance is being catalyzed by artist/cultural worker Marcel Diallo and a neighborhood of young, black artists including Githinji wa Mbire, Eesuu Orundide, letitia ntofon, and rappers Boots Riley of The Coup, Zumbi of Zion I and Adimu Madyun of rap group Hairdooo.

The Village Bottoms Cultural District contains The Black Dot Cafe, The Continental Club, Ester's Orbit Room, Pacific Cannery Lofts, 16th Street Train Station, Velocity Circus, Lower Bottom Playaz Community Theater and Environmental Indicators Project and more. 

The "Village Bottoms" is a name that many in Oakland's black cultural community, including the late Oakland poet laureate Reginald Lockett prefer to call a small section of the old West Oakland neighborhood that their parents, grandparents and/or great-grandparents lived in. Although the city of Oakland officially calls the larger district Prescott, the 1980s generation called it the boondocks and then The Lower Bottoms, and many of the new gentrifying residents prefer the even older Oakland Point, what ever one believes the name to be, its many names point to the overwhelming fact that the neighborhood is indeed gentrifying and is undergoing an intense transition and struggle for its very identity similar to what occurred in New York's Lower East Side neighborhood two decades earlier.

References 

Neighborhoods in Oakland, California